John Jones (1791–1889) was the second Archdeacon of Liverpool, serving from 1855 until 1886.

Jones was born on 5 October 1791 and educated at St John's College, Cambridge. He was ordained deacon on 19 February 1815, and priest on 24 December, the same year. After a curacy at St Mary, Leicester he was Vicar of St Andrew, Liverpool until 1980 and then Christ Church, Waterloo until 1889.

He died on 5 December 1889. His son won the VC while serving as a 25 years old lieutenant in the 9th Lancers during the Indian Mutiny.

References

1791 births
1889 deaths
Archdeacons of Liverpool
Alumni of St John's College, Cambridge